Wat Utokkepasemaram or Wat Uthokkhep Simaram Nam or Wat Num built in the period of King Chulalongkorn the Great, or Rama V, in Thai's style. In the past, there were Prapaenee Takbath Yond Buao and Songkran Festival, where a small lagoon situated beside and halfly embraced the ubosot is used. At King Rama IX, the Great period, Wat Num is under numbers of further developments, e.g. construction of Sala Thai, Larn Dhamma, Sala Rim Num, Pae Rim Num, and Utok Urban Heritage Museum. Wat Num received the Saemadhammajak Prize from Princess Maha Chakri Sirindhorn in 2006, in the field of Environmental Protection and Promotion.

History
Since 1893, Phra Cholatomakunmunee (Bhud Punnkataera), or Lord Abbot of monastery Thao had established Wat Num. In 1916, it obtained the first Wisungsema ubosod and undertook Phitee Pookpantasema; and buried the Nimit on 18 April 1924. Wat Num was the first Dhammayutikanikai of Meung Panusnikom. Lord Thao took care of Wat Num for number of years until his death. Later, Phra Khemtassi (Eaem Mekiyataera), the next Wat Kaobangzay's Abbot, had supervised Wat Num, until they obtained their first Abbot in 1917.

List of Abbots
 Phra Khru Sankavuttikorn (Tiang Yarnuchuko) (1917–1927)
 Phra Atikarn Dum (Juellako) (1928–1938)
 Phra Khru Nivadvorakun (Gloent Minintalo Thongnopphakun) (1938–1962)
 Phra Khru Vinaivatee (Jaroen Ativutho Dhammaluck) (1962–2002)
 Phra Maha Sompoch Dhammapochho (Narksittilaez) (2002–Present)

Phra Khru Sankavuttikorn
Phra Khru Sankavuttikorn (Tiang Yarnuchuko) (1917–1927), Phra Thananuglom for Somdej Phra Buddhakosajarn (Jaloen Yarn Worataera) had received the decree from Phra Khemtasse (Eaem Makiyathera) the Abbot of Wat Kaobanzay to build the first ubosod. Even though lacking of funds, a set boon celemony had been carried out. It obtained sufficient resources for the construction of ubosod's roof and ubosod's concrete foundation. A Phitee Pookpantasema had been carried out on 18 April 1924, accordingly.

Phra Atikarndum
Phra Atikarn Dum (Juellako) (1928–1938) obtained cooperation from nearby citizens developing Wat Num over 10 years.

Phra Khru Nivadvorakun
Phra Khru Nivadvorakun (Gloent Minintalo Thongnopphakun) (1938–1962), during this period Somdej Phra Buddhakosajarn (Jaloen Yarn Worataera) the Abbot of Wat Tephsirintrawart had been Phra Ubpacha for Bunpacha and Ubpasomboth of about 20–30 persons per year. In 1940, Somdej Phra Buddhakosajarn (Jaloen Yarn Worataera) had established a primary school named: “Utokvittayakorn School” with a 2-stories reinforced-concrete building, situated within Wat Num's land. This school was the first school in Aumpheur Panusnikom, which having a 2-stories building. The building was called by people as “Teug Khaou’’ (White Building).

Phra Khru Vinaivatee
Phra Khru Vinaivatee (Jaroen Ativutho Dhammaluck) (1962–2002) reconstructed the Salagarnprarean in 1977. By the efforts of Phra Radsunkvarayarn (Sanid Tirasinitho), Wat Zinkhun, Ang Thong; and Phra Khemsarsopon (Dhammanune Tivseethera), Wat Kaobanzay, the mathayom provincial school, named “Utokavitayakom School”, had been established in 1979. A construction of crematory of Wat Num started in 1984, and 1993. Wat Num obtained a Wisungsema on 23 January 1999, size 28x46 m. reconstructions by replacing the old ubosod. The celebration of gable apex placement of ubosod took place on 5–7 February 1999. Phra Khru Vinaivatee died, peacefully, on 24 April 2001. The Phitee Pookpantasema and buried the Nimit, took place on 9–17 February 2002.

Phra Maha Sompoch Dhammapochho
Phra Maha Sompoch Dhammapochho (Narksittilaez) (1902–Present), for Somdej Yannavarodom (Prayoo Suntungkuro). Phra Yannavarodom at Wat Tephsirintrawart decreed Phra Maha Sompoch for the position of acting Abbot, on 15 July 2002; 3 Months later he became the Abbot of the temple. He had been promoted to Tananukrom for Somdejphra Yannavarodom (Prayoo Suntungkuro), a so-called “Phra Khru Palad Samphiphatthanayanwaracharn Sasanaparaturatorn Yatiknissornsonkanunayok”. During his kind supervisions, Wat Num has continued to improve themselves in many aspects.

Additional information
Vinaivatee Foundation

Wat Num’s Branch
Wat Parkwaeseeyud (Wat Green Roof), Tha Takiap District (Tatakeab), Chachoengsao Province, Thailand

References
Remembrance book on the glory occasion whereby Princess Maha Chakri Sirindhorn, has kindly positioned the Chudd of the principle of Buddha image of the temple and purs liquid gold for molding the Birthday Buddha image on the 90th Anniversary of Somdejyarnvarodom celemony, at Wat Utokkepasemaram, Moo 4, Tumbon Watboth, Aumpheur Panusnikom, Chonburi Province, on Monday, 7 February 2005, 03:00 P.M.

Num